Story Of Laagir is an Indian Marathi-language drama film written and directed by Roheet Rao Narsinge and produced by G.K. Films Creations & MR Joker Entertainment. The film was theatrically released on 14 January 2022.

Cast 
 Sanjay Khapre 
 Chaitali Chavan 
  Roheet Rao Narsinge 
 Prema Kiran
 Mohan Jadhav 
 Millind Dastane
 Rutuja Andre 
 Somnath Yelnure

Soundtrack 
Music is given by Sunny-Sushant and Atul Joshi. Lyrics is by Nihar Rajahans, B.Gopinathan.

References

External links 

 

2020s Marathi-language films